Yo Yogi! is an American animated television series and the seventh entry in the Yogi Bear franchise produced by Hanna-Barbera that aired from September 14 to December 7, 1991, on NBC for 13 episodes. Jellystone! would come next on July 29, 2021, on HBO Max.

Synopsis
Taking place in Jellystone Town, the show features Yogi Bear and other popular Hanna-Barbera characters, depicted as teenage crime fighters. The team includes Yogi's friends Boo-Boo Bear, Huckleberry Hound, Snagglepuss, and Yogi's girlfriend Cindy Bear. The gang hang out at Jellystone Mall owned by "Diamond" Doggie Daddy, with Augie Doggie depicted as his heir to the mall business. Yogi and the gang work at an agency called L.A.F. (short for Lost and Found), where they act as detectives trying to solve mysteries under the supervision of the mall's security guard Officer Smith. Dickie Dastardly and his sidekick Muttley would cause trouble for Yogi and his gang. The show also introduced a teenage bear named Roxey Bear who was Cindy's rival and Yogi's competitor, as well as news reporter Chuck Toupée. The characters were never seen at home or school.

Some of Yogi's other pals like Secret Squirrel, Hardy Har Har, and Squiddly Diddly were also featured as young teens.

Other Hanna-Barbera characters are still in adult form: Hokey Wolf is the Mayor of Jellystone Town and Ding-A-Ling Wolf is his photographer, Loopy De Loop works at the Jellystone Mall's Picnic Basket Food Court, Atom Ant served as Jellystone Town's superhero, Quick Draw McGraw and Baba Looey were wild west-themed entertainers, Pixie and Dixie lived in the cheese cottage within a cheese store owned by Mr. Jinks, Lippy the Lion owns a jewelry store that also sells jam, Peter Potamus and So-So ran a plant shop called "Peter Potamus' Plant Palace", Snooper is a crime-solving celebrity while Blabber ran the "Crooks 'n' Books" store, and Magilla Gorilla appeared as a teen idol in "Jellystone Jam" as Magilla Ice (a takeoff of Vanilla Ice). Also, Granny Sweet made an appearance in the episode "Super Duper Snag".

Production
Yo Yogi! featured episodes, or parts of episodes, in 3D, with Kellogg's Rice Krispies offering 3D glasses. Generally, the 3D scenes were chase scenes of the variety made famous by Hanna-Barbera in the Scooby-Doo series. At the beginning of these 3D sequences, Yogi would spin his hat atop his head, as a cue to viewers to don their 3D glasses.

On March 6, 1992, in response to the success of its Saturday morning live-action teen sitcom Saved by the Bell, NBC cancelled its entire Saturday morning block of cartoons (including Yo Yogi!) and replaced the cartoons with a new block of live-action shows targeting teenagers in addition to a Saturday edition of The Today Show. Yo Yogi! last aired in syndication as part of The Funtastic World of Hanna-Barbera.

The first few episodes used digital ink and paint, while the next few episodes used cel animation.

Modern voice actors played the voices of certain characters not only because some of them are teenagers, but due to the deaths of Daws Butler, Mel Blanc, and Paul Frees before this series began.

Episodes

Voice cast
 Charlie Adler - 
 Lewis Arquette – Bombastic Bobby (in "Yo, Yogi!")
 Greg Berg – Huckleberry Hound, Moe Wendell (in "Hats Off to Yogi"), Joe Wendell (in "Hats Off to Yogi")
 Charlie Brill - 
 Greg Burson – Yogi Bear, Quick Draw McGraw, Snagglepuss, Mr. Jinks, Loopy De Loop, Peter Potamus, Lippy the Lion, Officer Smith, Uncle Undercover
 Bernard Erhard – The Pest (in "Super Duper Snag")
 Pat Fraley – Mad Painter (in "It's All Relative")
 Pat Harrington Jr. – William Shakesbear (in "To Tell the Truth, Forsooth")
 Matt Hurwitz – Hokey Wolf
 Arte Johnson – Lou (in "Huck's Doggone Day")
 Nancy Linari - 
 Danny Mann - 
 Gail Matthius – Roxy Bear
 Mitzi McCall – Talula LaTrane (in "Fashion Smashin'")
 Allan Melvin – Magilla "Ice" Gorilla
 Don Messick – Boo-Boo Bear, Pixie, Squiddly Diddly, Atom Ant, Muttley, Pierre (in "Hats Off to Yogi")
 Howard Morris – Murray (in "Huck's Doggone Day")
 Roger Nolan - 
 Rob Paulsen – Hardy Har Har, Dickie Dastardly, Super Snooper, Chuck Toupée, Wee Willie Gorilla (in "Mellow Fellows"), Robin Hood (in "Huck's Doggone Day")
 Henry Polic II – Baba Looey, P.R. Flack (in "The Big Snoop")
 Ronnie Schell – Calvin Klunk (in "Fashion Smashin'")
 Hal Smith – Blabber Mouse
 Kath Soucie – Cindy Bear, Granny Sweet (in "Super Duper Snag"), Secret Squirrel, Mother (in "Super Duper Snag")
 John Stephenson – "Diamond" Doggie Daddy, Mr. Myopic (in "To Tell the Truth, Forsooth"), Bruno Bear (in "It's All Relative")
 Sally Struthers - 
 S. Scott Bullock -
 B.J. Ward - 
 Lennie Weinrib – Max the Mole (in "Grindhog Day")
 Frank Welker –
 Patric Zimmerman – Augie Doggie, Dixie, Ding-A-Ling Wolf

Home media
In the early '90s, a VHS release of the show came with 3D glasses. As of 2018, there are no plans for a complete series set release from either Warner Home Video or Warner Archive. However, it is available on iTunes as part of the Hanna-Barbera Diamond Collection. The complete series was formerly available as part of the Boomerang streaming service.

See also
 List of works produced by Hanna-Barbera Productions
 The Yogi Bear Show
 The New Yogi Bear Show
 Yogi's Treasure Hunt
 Yogi's Gang
 Yogi's Space Race
 Galaxy Goof-Ups

References

External links
 
 Yo Yogi! at The Big Cartoon Database

1991 American television series debuts
1991 American television series endings
1990s American animated television series
American animated television spin-offs
American children's animated adventure television series
American children's animated comedy television series
American children's animated mystery television series
American prequel television series
NBC original programming
Animated television series about mammals
Television series by Hanna-Barbera
The Funtastic World of Hanna-Barbera
English-language television shows
Crossover animated television series
Child versions of cartoon characters
Yogi Bear television series
Huckleberry Hound television series
Top Cat
Wacky Races spin-offs